Aleksandr Aleksandrovich Sevidov (September 5, 1921April 15, 1992) was a Soviet professional football coach and player. As a player, he made his professional debut in the Soviet First League in 1939 for FC Dynamo Kazan.

Honours as a coach
 Soviet Top League champion: 1971, 1976 (spring).
 Soviet Top League runner-up: 1972, 1973.
 Soviet Top League bronze: 1963, 1975.
 Soviet Cup winner: 1977, 1984.
 Soviet Cup finalist: 1965, 1973.
 UEFA Cup Winners' Cup semifinalist: 1978, 1985.

References

1921 births
1992 deaths
Russian footballers
Soviet footballers
Soviet Top League players
FC Rubin Kazan players
FC Dinamo Minsk players
FC Torpedo Moscow players
Soviet football managers
FC Zimbru Chișinău managers
FC Dinamo Minsk managers
FC Kairat managers
FC Dynamo Kyiv managers
FC Dynamo Moscow managers
FC Lokomotiv Moscow managers
FC Rotor Volgograd managers
Deaths from cancer in Russia
Merited Coaches of the Soviet Union
Association football forwards
FC Dynamo Kazan players